Larcom Mountain is a mountain located in Carroll County, New Hampshire, USA.  The top of the mountain, and its subpeak, Little Larcom Mountain, are part of the Lakes Region Conservation Trust.

The mountain is named after poet Lucy Larcom, who visited the area frequently while staying at the Bearcamp River House.

See also

 List of mountains in New Hampshire

References

External links
  Castle in the Clouds
  Larcom Mountain - FranklinSites.com Hiking Guide

Mountains of New Hampshire
Mountains of Carroll County, New Hampshire